A shoot is an immature plant or portion of a plant.

Shoot may also refer to:
 Photo shoot, a photography session; an event wherein a photographer takes photographs
 Shooting, the firing of projectile weapons

Arts and entertainment

Film and television
 The Shoot (film), a 1964 film directed by Robert Siodmak
 Shoot (film), a 1976 action thriller starring Cliff Robertson
 "Shoot" (Mad Men), a 2007 television episode

Periodicals
 Shoot (advertising magazine), an American magazine since 1990
 Shoot (football magazine), a British magazine 1969–2008
 Shoot, a self-published photography periodical by Paul Sepuya

Other media
 Shoot (Burden), a 1971 performance art piece by Chris Burden in which he was shot
 "Shoot" (Hellblazer), a story from the DC Comics series Hellblazer
 The Shoot (video game), a 2010 rail shooter game for the PlayStation 3
 "Shoot" (song), by BlocBoy JB, 2017
 "Shoot", a song by Boys Like Girls from Crazy World

Wrestling
 Shoot (professional wrestling), an unplanned occurrence in a wrestling event
 Shoot wrestling, a combat sport
 Takedown (grappling), or shoot

Other uses
Shoot, a minced oath used in lieu of "shit"

See also
 Aoki Densetsu Shoot! or Blue Legend Shoot, a Japanese manga
 Chute (disambiguation)
 Shooter (disambiguation)
 Shooting (disambiguation)
 Shot (disambiguation)